Sushant School of Art and Architecture is a private architecture college in Sushant Lok II, Sector 55, Gurgaon, National Capital Region (India), India.

History 
Sushant School of Art and Architecture was established in September 1989 by Chiranjiv Charitable Trust. The school is located in a campus shared with the Ansal University, spread over 15 acre of land with the Aravali hills in the backdrop.

The school is recognized by the Ministry of Human Resource Development, Government of India, All India Council for Technical Education (AICTE) and Council of Architecture. The school offers a 5 year undergraduate degree programme in architecture from Ansal University.
Sushant School is also an affiliate member of the Association of the Collegiate Schools of Architecture (ACSA), U.S.A.

Chiranjiv Charitable Trust understands the rapidly evolving design environment within India and a change within global dynamics set the backdrop for inventive thinking and considered approaches to design. The trust to fill the emerging gap has started the Sushant School of Design.

The School responds to the need to develop India’s professional design community, from specialists to design managers. At the School students are exposed to a process that travels between concept and enterprise.

The trust finds its faith in the agenda of change, and through education it inspires students to experiment, create, and refine their ideas.

Culture

Admissions in the best institutes
The school has recorded success with graduate admissions in to grade institutions both inside as well as outside India such as the CEPT Ahmedabad, IIT's, NID Ahmedabad, Yale School of Architecture, University of Pennsylvania, GSAPP, Columbia University, Harvard Graduate School of Design, MIT, Rhode Island School of Design, Cornell in the USA and the AA, UCL and University of Bath in the UK; the number of admissions perhaps exceeding those of any other school in India. Its Students have also been selected by the Government of United Kingdom for the "Developing Solutions Scholarship" for studies in Advanced Tall Buildings, a first of its kind in the entire world, at the University of Nottingham, UK.

Festival
The annual College Festival (known as 'Fest') within Sushantites is the highlight of the Sushant culture. Each year, students are given responsibilities like designing a structure (stage), an architecture exhibition, an art exhibition, complete lighting and a magazine which is named after the annual fest. The A to Z of the event, including sponsorship to execution, is handled by the students themselves.

QAE, workshop and lectures
The school organizes Quality Improvement Programs, workshops and lectures by visiting professionals from India and abroad. A series of lectures, Platform, was initiated in recent years.

Founder's Day
Each year 1 September is celebrated as the Founder's Day. This day is also the birth date of Sushant's favorite teacher and founder, Prof. Mansinh Rana. For years this day was also celebrated as the Fresher's Day.

Faculty 
The faculty is drawn from diverse academic and professional backgrounds, with academic thrusts as diverse as Fine Arts, Digital Architecture, Urbanism and Architecture of the City and Habitat and Human Settlements.
 
The Dean emeritus and ex-Director of the school is Late Prof Mansinh M. Rana, prominent Indian architect. In past, the school has been served by eminent professors like Prof. S.K. Das, Prof. Ram Sharma, Prof. Rajat Ray and Ashok Grover.

References

External links
 
 - 63k

Architecture schools in India
Universities and colleges in Gurgaon
Educational institutions established in 1989
1989 establishments in Haryana